Khanjian or Khanjyan (Western Armenian Խանճեան) is an Armenian surname and place name. It may refer to:

People
Aghasi Khanjian (1901—1936), first secretary of the Armenian Communist Party
Arsinée Khanjian (born 1958), Canadian actress and film director
David Khanjyan (1940—1981), Soviet conductor and pianist
Grigor Khanjyan (1926-2000), Artist (People's Artist of Soviet Union)

Places 
Khanjyan, Armenia, a town in the Armavir Province of Armenia

See also 
Khanjin, a village in Zanjan Province, Iran
Andrea Khanjin, (born 1987), a Canadian politician
Khenejin, a city in Markazi Province, Iran

Armenian-language surnames